Les Tourailles is a commune in the Orne département and the region of Normandy in north-western France. On 1 January 2016, it was merged into the new commune of Athis-Val-de-Rouvre.

Geography
 Watercourses: The river Rouvre.

History
 Notre-Dame de la Recouvrance chapel, departure point for pilgrimages since the 9th century.

Administration

Population

Sites and monuments
 Basilica of the Notre-Dame de la Recouvrance chapel, completed in 1939.
 16th-century castle keep, a good ensemble with two pavilions.
 Bridge of Tourailles, the remains of a Roman bridge.
 Pilgrimages on 8 September and 31 May.

People associated with Les Tourailles
 Antoine de Montchrestien (born Falaise, Calvados 1570, died Les Tourailles 1621). Poet and author. Known by the name of 'Vatteville'. He tried to revive the religious wars of the sixteenth century but was killed when making a traveller's stop in Les Tourailles.

See also
 Communes of the Orne department

References

Tourailles